is an isometric perspective scrolling shooter arcade game that was released by Namco in 1987, only in Japan; it runs on the company's System 1 hardware, and used a three-quarter-view perspective (another one of them is Namco's own Pac-Mania).

Gameplay
The player must alternate between a tank named "Vanguard" and a helicopter named "Hardy" (and for the tenth and final mission, a hovercraft named "Atlanta"), to kill enemies both on land and in the air. Some air-based enemies will leave behind powerups for Vanguard to collect, when hit by its anti-aircraft missiles; they can restore its fuel, increase its fuel capacity, make it invulnerable for a short period of time, and even grant it an extra life if it manages to collect enough of them (which is initially thirteen, but it can go up to sixteen).

This game was dedicated to Shoko Tamako Sumie from all its staff; upon completion of the game, it gives a list of schematics for the player tank, and a passage from In The Cold Morning Of August.

Reception 

In Japan, Game Machine listed Blazer on their September 1, 1987 issue as being the fifteenth most-successful table arcade unit of the month.

References

External links

Blazer at the Arcade History database

1987 video games
Arcade video games
Arcade-only video games
Helicopter video games
Namco arcade games
Japan-exclusive video games
Scrolling shooters
Tank simulation video games
Video games developed in Japan